Arthur Deane Nesbitt OBE, DFC, CdeG (16 November 1910 – 22 February 1978) was a Canadian businessman and a decorated pilot and Wing Commander in World War II.

Early life 
Nesbitt was born in Westmount, Quebec, the son of the very successful stockbroker and co-founder of Nesbitt, Thomson and Company, Arthur James Nesbitt. Trained as an electrical engineer, after his older brother Aird decided to take over permanent management of the family-owned Ogilvy department store in Montreal, Nesbitt joined the family's securities business. On the death of his father in 1954, he became head of the brokerage firm and took over the presidency of the Nesbitt Thomson holding company, Power Corporation of Canada. Under his guidance, Nesbitt Thomson expanded across Canada, and into the United States and Europe. They were the first Canadian firm in three decades to obtain a seat on the New York Stock Exchange.

A flying enthusiast, Nesbitt obtained his pilot's license and as a member of the Montreal Light Aeroplane Club, and was twice voted the James Lytell Memorial Trophy as the club's top pilot.

Wartime Service 
He had 200 flying hours to his credit when he enlisted in the R.C.A.F. on 15 September 1939. Nesbitt was trained at Camp Borden as a fighter pilot. As a Flying Officer Nesbitt was then posted to No 1 Squadron RCAF, and flew Hurricanes with the unit during the Battle of Britain before being wounded on 15 September. On 26 August 1940 Nesbitt claimed a 'Do215' destroyed, and Bf 109s on 4 and 15 September. He also received the Distinguished Flying Cross.

When recovered he later commanded No.401 Squadron, and returned to Canada in September 1941 to command No.14 Squadron and later No.111 Squadron. He was promoted to Wing Commander in June 1942 and given command of Station Annette Island.Nesbitt was made CO, No.6 SFTS, Dunneville, in December 1943, and in March 1944 returned to the UK to command No.144 Wing. he then joined No.83 Group HQ as Accidents Investigation Officer. Promoted to Group Captain on 1 January 1945, Nesbitt then commanded No.143 Wing, with Hawker Typhoons, from January to August 1945 before returning to Canada in September 1945, retiring in November 1947.

Along with his brother Aird, who served in the Canadian Army, he was part of the liberation of the Netherlands and at Eindhoven. For his service, Nesbitt received a number of military honours. In 1946 he was made an Officer of the Order of the British Empire and in 1947 a Commander of the Order of Orange-Nassau with Swords, and awarded the Croix de Guerre with Silver Star by the government of France.

Postwar career 
After being decommissioned at the end of the War, Nesbitt rejoined the family's St. James Street securities firm. Highly successful in business, he also organised the financing for the TransCanada pipeline in the 1950s, the then-largest natural gas pipeline in the world and one of the most significant energy projects in the history of Canada. His long and successful business career earned him an induction into the Canadian Business Hall of Fame.

At the age of 68, Nesbitt suffered a skiing accident that left him near totally paralyzed on 4 February. He died in Montreal in 1978 and was interred in the Mount Royal Cemetery.

In his honor, the BMO Nesbitt Burns division of the Bank of Montreal established the A. Deane Nesbitt/Charles Burns Award recognizing exceptional performance.

See also 
List of Bishop's College School alumni

References

Sources
 Air Force Association of Canada decorations for A. Deane Nesbitt
 Government of Canada, "The Nesbitts" - Nation Builders collection

1910 births
1978 deaths
Canadian aviators
Canadian World War II pilots
Canadian people of Scottish descent
Canadian stockbrokers
The Few
Bishop's College School alumni
Recipients of the Distinguished Flying Cross (United Kingdom)
Canadian Officers of the Order of the British Empire
Power Corporation of Canada
People from Montreal
People from Westmount, Quebec
Royal Canadian Air Force officers
Stock and commodity market managers
Anglophone Quebec people
Recipients of the Croix de Guerre 1939–1945 (France)
Commanders of the Order of Orange-Nassau
Royal Air Force pilots of World War II
Burials at Mount Royal Cemetery